Gary Bradshaw (born 30 December 1982) is an English footballer who plays for North Ferriby as a striker.

Career
Born in Beverley, Humberside, Bradshaw started his career with Hull City. He made his debut in a 3–0 defeat against Rotherham United on 7 March 2000 and finished the 1999–2000 season with 11 appearances. He scored his first goal for the side in a 4–1 victory over Mansfield Town on 5 March 2002. Scarborough signed him on loan in February 2003, where he made two appearances in the Conference National. He had his contract with Hull terminated by mutual consent shortly after this loan spell.

He then moved onto Harrogate Town in the Northern Premier League Premier Division, where he made 15 appearances and scored four goals before joining North Ferriby United in the autumn of 2003. He finished the 2003–04 season with 17 goals in 27 appearances, and during his first full season with the club he was captain as they won the Northern Premier League First Division and scored 39 goals in 50 appearances. He played for League Two side Cheltenham Town's reserves in August 2005 and eventually signed for the club in September. After being sent off in his debut against Mansfield Town, and making two further appearances for Cheltenham, he rejoined North Ferriby on a month's loan in March 2006. He resigned for the club in July 2006 and in August became the first player to sign a contract with them in their history. After helping Ferriby to promotion to the Conference North in the 2012–13 season, Bradshaw went on to sign for Scarborough Athletic. In December 2015 he dropped down 2 divisions to sign for Hull United A.F.C.

References

External links
Gary Bradshaw profile at the North Ferriby United website

1982 births
Living people
Sportspeople from Beverley
Footballers from the East Riding of Yorkshire
English footballers
Association football forwards
Hull City A.F.C. players
Scarborough F.C. players
Harrogate Town A.F.C. players
North Ferriby United A.F.C. players
Cheltenham Town F.C. players
Scarborough Athletic F.C. players
Hull United A.F.C. players
English Football League players
National League (English football) players
Northern Premier League players